Ghost Whisperer is an American supernatural television series, which ran on CBS from September 23, 2005, to May 21, 2010.

The series follows the life of Melinda Gordon (Jennifer Love Hewitt), who has the ability to see and communicate with ghosts. While trying to live as normal a life as possible—she is married and owns an antique store—Melinda helps earthbound spirits resolve their problems and cross over into the light, or the spirit world. Her tasks are difficult and at times she struggles with people who push her away and do not believe in her gift. In addition, the ghosts are mysterious and sometimes menacing at first, and Melinda must use the clues available to her to understand the spirits' needs and help them. The show was created by John Gray and was produced by Sander/Moses Productions, executive producer, and Jennifer Love Hewitt in association with ABC Studios and CBS Television Studios.

On May 18, 2010, CBS canceled the series after five seasons.

Premise
Melinda Gordon (Jennifer Love Hewitt) is a young woman from the town of Grandview, New York, who has the ability to see and communicate with the dead. Melinda lives with her husband, Jim Clancy (David Conrad), and later their son Aiden (Connor Gibbs). She owns a shop called "Same as It Never Was". Each ghost seeks Melinda's help in relaying a message or completing a task that will put their spirit to rest, and allow them to cross over into the light. Those who died with unfinished business become earthbound and cannot cross over, and Melinda, as their earthly representative, helps them to find peace. The show does not present the ghosts as having sinned; rather it is the spirits' own guilt that condemns them, and their own fear of judgment that keeps them from "crossing over" into an afterlife.

The series also starred Aisha Tyler as Andrea Marino, Melinda's best friend, who runs the antique shop with her. Andrea is killed in the first-season finale. During the second season, Melinda meets Delia Banks (Camryn Manheim), a struggling real estate agent who forms a friendship with Melinda and who eventually agrees to run the antique shop with her. Delia is shocked to find out about Melinda's abilities; in fact, at first she claims Melinda needs psychological help.  Delia eventually accepts Melinda's gift, though she remains skeptical at times. Delia has a son named Ned Banks (Tyler Patrick Jones season 2, Christoph Sanders thereafter) who finds out about Melinda's gift long before his mother does.

Melinda also forms a friendship with Rick Payne (Jay Mohr), a professor at Rockland University. He helps Melinda solve the conflicts of ghosts throughout the second and third seasons. He departs in the fourth-season premiere for an expedition in the Himalayas. The same episode introduced Eli James (Jamie Kennedy), another professor at the university, who goes through a near-death experience which unlocks an ability to hear ghosts. Unlike Melinda, he cannot see them. He becomes a close friend to Melinda and helps her investigate the hauntings.

Episodes

Cast

Jennifer Love Hewitt as Melinda Gordon
Aisha Tyler as Andrea Marino (seasons 1–2)
David Conrad as Jim Clancy / Sam Lucas
Camryn Manheim as Delia Banks (seasons 2–5)
Jay Mohr as Professor Rick Payne (season 3; recurring, season 2; special guest, season 4)
Christoph Sanders as Ned Banks (seasons 4–5; recurring, season 3)
Jamie Kennedy as Professor Eli James (seasons 4–5)

Notes

Production

Development
Ghost Whisperer is based in part on the work of Mary Ann Winkowski. Development of the show dates back to at least two years before its premiere. James Van Praagh was a co-executive producer and consultant on the show.

The show was produced by Sander/Moses Productions in association with CBS Television Studios (originally Paramount Network Television) in season one and ABC Studios (originally Touchstone Television in the first two seasons) and CBS Paramount Network Television in seasons two to four.

The show was filmed on the Universal Studios back lot in Los Angeles. One area on the lot is Courthouse Square from the Back to the Future trilogy, though it has been drastically modified to depict Grandview. For example, the clock tower in Back to the Future has been completely covered up. The front of Melinda and Jim's house is also the same set used by the Finch family in the film adaptation of To Kill a Mockingbird. Cast and crew members said they believed that the set got visits from real spirits. After the show's cancellation and shortly before the sets were torn down, Jennifer Love Hewitt filmed a tour demonstrating the ways in which the areas were different from those shown in the TV broadcast.

Sound effects were completed at Smart Post Sound. Visual effects for the pilot and some season one episodes were completed at Flash Film Works. Visual effects for nearly the entire series were created at Eden FX. Roy Forge Smith, who frequently collaborated with John Gary, was the production designer on 44 episodes of the show, spanning two season, from 2005 to 2007.

Creator John Gray grew up in Brooklyn, New York, which is not far from Grand View-On-Hudson (also called Grand View), west of the Hudson River. Piermont is often referenced in episodes as the neighboring town, which is accurate to real life as Grand View is actually located just north of Piermont. Professors Rick Payne and Eli James worked at the fictional "Rockland University", and, perhaps not coincidentally, the actual village of Grand View is a village located in Rockland County, New York.

Release

Broadcast
Season one premiered on September 23, 2005, and ended on May 5, 2006. It received an average of 10.20million viewers. Season two of Ghost Whisperer premiered on September 22, 2006, and ended on May 11, 2007, again airing Friday nights on CBS during the same timeslot. CBS officially renewed the show for a third season placing it in its regular Friday 8 p.m. ET time slot. The third season premiered September 28, 2007. Twelve episodes were completed before the Writers Guild of America strike, and once the strike ended, CBS had announced that the show would return April 4, 2008, with six episodes. On February 15, 2008, CBS renewed Ghost Whisperer for a fourth season. For the fourth season, Jamie Kennedy joined the cast as Psychology professor Eli James. Jay Mohr left after the first episode as the plot had his character, Professor Rick Payne, going on sabbatical (Mohr took a role in Gary Unmarried). Recurring cast member Christoph Sanders joined as a regular cast member. The fourth season of Ghost Whisperer premiered on Friday, October 3, 2008, and concluded on May 15, 2009, and consisted of 23 episodes. In an interview by P.K. Simonds with E! Online, it was announced that Ghost Whisperer would return for a fifth season. CBS renewed Ghost Whisperer for the fifth season on May 20, 2009, which began airing on Friday, September 25, 2009, at 8 p.m. ET and ran for 22 episodes.

Syndication
On May 5, 2008, it was announced that the first three seasons of Ghost Whisperer were purchased for $169.8million ($700,000 per episode, per network) for syndication by SyFy, Ion Television, and WeTV. Episodes began airing in mid-2009 on ION, and in the third quarter of 2009 on SyFy and We. The first four seasons began airing in syndication on CBC Television in Canada on August 31, 2009.

Home media
The Region 1 DVD releases are distributed by Paramount Home Entertainment/CBS DVD, while releases in all other regions are distributed by Walt Disney Studios Home Entertainment (formerly Buena Vista Home Entertainment).

On March 17, 2015, CBS DVD released Ghost Whisperer- The Complete series on DVD in Region 1.

Streaming
The series is available to stream on The CW's free digital-only network, CW Seed.

The show is available on Hulu.

Reception

U.S. ratings

Episodes in the first half of the fourth season won their time slot every week in viewers, and across all age demographics, including the 18–49 age bracket, and also usually won the night for CBS as the most-watched show on Friday nights. Furthermore, fourteen episodes from Season 4 surpassed 10million viewers, of which seven surpassed 11million viewers.

Cancellation
On May 18, 2010, citing rising costs and a decline in viewership, CBS announced that Ghost Whisperer would not be renewed for another season. ABC expressed interest in picking up Ghost Whisperer for the 2010–11 U.S. television season; however, on May 27, 2010, Michael Ausiello reported that ABC had passed on renewing Ghost Whisperer for a sixth season.

In 2010, Zap2it declared Ghost Whisperer the second "most missed axed show" after a poll determined 19.4 percent of voters would miss it.

In October 2010, Jennifer Love Hewitt thanked the fans of the show for their support in a goodbye video (filmed in June 2010), saying "Your love and support has meant everything to the cast and crew of Ghost Whisperer and we will all miss you guys very, very much. Go get our DVDs, think about us, miss us and know how much we all will miss you. Much love."

In January 2011, Hewitt told the press of her opinion about the cancellation, saying "When you’ve taken people on a journey for so long, the least you can do is give them a goodbye. For a show that was about unfinished business, we didn’t get to finish."

In January 2018, Hewitt was really adamant about a potential reboot or revival: “If they’re going to redo it, then I have to go back and be the ghost whisperer because I am not giving up my “Ghost Whisperer” throne. That part just meant too much to me, and it was so much of who I was, I worked really hard to make Melinda who she is. So if they wanted to do a 10-episode revival on Netflix, like finishing the series or something, I’m happy to do that. But giving it over to somebody would crush me."

Awards and nominations

In other media

Webisodes
Ghost Whisperer: The Other Side is a series of webisodes released on the Ghost Whisperer website. Starting in Season 2, a total of eight webisodes were produced for every season.

The first two seasons follow Zach (played by Mark Hapka), a young delivery boy who dies while delivering a package. He soon learns how to do things in the spirit world, and gets revenge on his best friend Danny, who he thinks killed him. Season 3 of the webisodes deals with a ghost named Marc (played by Justin Loyal) trying to help his high school crush Olivia (played by Jaimi Paige) find true love as her fiancé George does not love her. The fourth and final season of the webisodes deals with the ghost of a man named Bo (played by Matt Knudsen) who haunts James Tyler (played by Mark Lutz) and his family after they move into their new home.

Melinda from the television series doesn't appear in the internet series as it takes place entirely in the spirit world. However, characters from the webisodes have appeared in the television series. In the second-season finale of Ghost Whisperer, Zach made an appearance while trying to get help from Melinda before being taken into the Dark Side, leaving the internet series in its own cliffhanger. Zach later made another appearance and crossed over in season three episode 16 of Ghost Whisperer. Marc and Olivia make brief and uncredited appearances in episode 21 of season 4 of Ghost Whisperer.

Internet promotion
andshamethedevil.net is a site linked to Ghost Whisperer. The site is mentioned in the Season 3 premiere. By clicking on the star in the upper right hand corner, the site appears to crack into pieces. Those pieces can be moved by dragging, revealing this message: "Meet Me In The Underworld". Small type at the bottom of the page read the repeated words: "bloody mary. bloody mary. bloody mary." Also clicking on the word 'bloody', it leads to another site rubloodymary.com. There is a hidden message under the graphic. By holding down the mouse key and dragging it around, a new image will appear along with the message. andshamethedevil.net is no longer used as promotion for the show and has since been turned into an unrelated advertising blog, although rubloodymary.com can still be accessed by typing the address into an address box in an internet browser.

In the series, penthius.info is often used by Melinda to look up information about the families and ghosts that she is investigating in Grandview. A real world version of this site was created in February 2008. The site description read: "Penthius.Info is a free search engine and video super site based on the search engine in the television series The Ghost Whisperer with Jennifer Love Hewitt." It was first mentioned in a post on TV.com by misscalais, a fan who created the site to promote the show.

Ghost Whisperer was also heavily promoted on the website, House of Ghost Whisperer built and maintained by Scott L. Spencer. As of today it is still active.

Video game
In July 2009, Legacy Interactive announced a licensing agreement with CBS Consumer Products to develop a video game based on the Ghost Whisperer television series. In January 2010, it was announced that the game was set to debut on the PC and Mac and include characters and themes from the show. On November 1, 2010, a developer diary was posted on the game's website, detailing areas in the game and confirming that Melinda, Jim, Delia and Eli will feature. The release date, which was initially early 2010, was changed to 2011 and the subtitle announced in the original press release, Shadowlands, was dropped from the game.  The game was written by Emmy award-winning television writer Lance Gentile. It was released on August 7, 2012, exclusively at Wal-Mart.

See also
List of ghost films
El don de Alba (remake)

References

External links

 
 
 Ghost Whisperer at Yahoo! TV
 Ghost Whisperer at Living TV (UK)
 House of Ghost Whisperer
 Ghost Whisperer Italia 
 "Scoop: 'Ghost Whisperer,' 'Tree Hill' do time warp (again)" by Michael Ausiello, EW.com

 
2005 American television series debuts
2010 American television series endings
2000s American drama television series
2010s American drama television series
2000s American supernatural television series
2010s American supernatural television series
American fantasy television series
CBS original programming
English-language television shows
Television series about ghosts
Romantic fantasy television series
Saturn Award-winning television series
Television shows about psychic powers
Television series by ABC Studios
Television series by CBS Studios
Television shows set in New York (state)
Television shows featuring audio description
Television shows filmed in Los Angeles
Television shows filmed in California